Xavier Arsène-Henry (1919-2009) was a French modernist architect and urban planner. He designed many tall residential buildings on the outskirts of French cities.

Early life
Xavier Arsène-Henry was born on 10 May 1919 in Bordeaux, France.

Career
He was a proponent of modern architecture.

That same year, he designed three residential tall buildings in Reims: the Tour Berlioz, the Tour Bach, and the Tour Beethoven. He designed similar residential tall buildings in Montereau-Fault-Yonne a year later, in 1961.

He designed the Tour Chartis, also known as the Tour AIG, in Courbevoie in 1967. A year later, in 1968, he designed the Centrale à béton in Ivry-sur-Seine.

He designed , a neighbourhood on the southern outskirts of Marseille, in 1969. Four years later, in 1973, he designed the offices of the Corsican subsidiary of BNP Paribas at 475  in Marseille.

He designed two buildings in Puteaux: Le Galion in 1982 and Le Minerve in 1984.

He was a professor at the École nationale supérieure des Beaux-Arts. He was the recipient of the Rome Prize from the American Academy in Rome.

Death
He died on 19 June 2009 in Paris.

Bibliography
La ville de l'an 2000 (revue Études, 1972).
Notre ville, Mame, 1969Rentrons, il se fait tard, le long voyage d'un architecte (1919-1998) (Paris: L'Harmattan, 1999).J'allais oublier de vous dire... : suite du long voyage d'un architecte, 1998-2002 (Paris, L'Harmattan, 2002).Arrêtons nous quelques instants, 3e étape du long voyage d'un architecte (2002-2006) (Paris: L'Harmattan, 2006).Cap-Ferret : dessins et textes de Xavier Arsène-Henry : 50 ans de dessins'' (Elyte, 2008).

References

1919 births
2009 deaths
Architects from Bordeaux
École des Beaux-Arts alumni
20th-century French architects
Modernist architects
French urban planners
Academic staff of the École des Beaux-Arts
Prix de Rome for architecture
Officiers of the Légion d'honneur
Commanders of the Ordre national du Mérite